Snasudovo is a rural locality (a village) in Podlesnoye Rural Settlement, Vologodsky District, Vologda Oblast, Russia. The population was 91 as of 2002. There are 10 streets.

Geography 
Snasudovo is located 13 km southeast of Vologda (the district's administrative centre) by road. Moseykovo is the nearest rural locality.

References 

Rural localities in Vologodsky District